Mount St. Mary's Mountaineers head coach Tom Gravante was assisted by coaches Kevin Giblin, Nick Kellinger, and Ted Moon. Cormac Giblin, Dan Bradley, Jared McMahon, and Ben Ward served as team captains. 2022 team captains Noah Daniels and Connor McMahon transferred to other programs prior to the season.

Roster

Transfers

Schedule 

Pairings: SC = Scrimmage; NC = Non-conference; MAAC = Conference; CT = Conference Tournament

References 

Mount St. Mary's
Mount St. Mary's Mountaineers men's lacrosse